Sally Reddin is a paralympic athlete from Great Britain competing mainly in category F54 shot put events.

Sally Reddin competed in the shot put and javelin events at the 1996 Summer Paralympics.  She then went on to win the gold medal four years later in 2000 in the shot put but was unable to defend this title finishing fourth in 2008 Summer Paralympics.

References

Paralympic athletes of Great Britain
Athletes (track and field) at the 2000 Summer Paralympics
Athletes (track and field) at the 2004 Summer Paralympics
Athletes (track and field) at the 2008 Summer Paralympics
Paralympic gold medalists for Great Britain
Living people
Medalists at the 2000 Summer Paralympics
Medalists at the 2004 Summer Paralympics
Year of birth missing (living people)
Paralympic medalists in athletics (track and field)
British female shot putters
Wheelchair shot putters
Paralympic shot putters